The Shepparton Art Museum is an art Museum in Shepparton, Victoria, Australia. It holds one of Australia's most significant collections of Australian ceramics. It is host to the Sidney Myer Fund Australian Ceramic Award (SMFACA) and the Indigenous Ceramic Art Award.

In 2013 the SAM Foundation was established to raise funds for a new building. In 2017, a design by Denton Corker Marshall won the architectural design competition for a new Shepparton Art Museum building.

References 

Shepparton
Museums in Victoria (Australia)